This is a list of songs that reached No. 1 on the Billboard Japan Top Download Songs Chart in Japan in 2017. Billboard Japan made this chart in October. Oricon also does a Download  Songs Chart. Both charts are not exactly, but mostly the same. Chart of Billboard Japan is used here for convenience.

Chart History

References

Number-one digital singles of 2017
Japan Digital Singles